Rusa II was king of Urartu between around 680 BC and 639 BC. It was during his reign that the massive fortress complex, Karmir-Blur, was constructed.

Rusa II was known to Esarhaddon, king of Assyria, as Yaya or Iaya.

A cuneiform inscription has been found commemorating the king building a canal to channel water to the city of Quarlini from the Ildaruni (Hrazdan River).

See also

 List of kings of Urartu

References

Urartian kings
7th-century BC rulers